Myeloma Foundation may refer to:

 Multiple Myeloma Research Foundation
 International Myeloma Foundation
 Africa Myeloma Foundation